Aaja Nachle is a 2007 Indian Hindi-language dance film produced by Aditya Chopra and directed by Anil Mehta. The film stars Madhuri Dixit in her first film in five years after Devdas (2002), alongside Konkona Sen Sharma, Jugal Hansraj, and Kunal Kapoor in pivotal roles. 

Aaja Nachle was released in India and the United States on 30 November 2007.  The film opened to mixed-to-negative reviews and was declared a flop by Box Office India. 

At the 53rd Filmfare Awards, Aaja Nachle received 2 nominations – Best Actress (Dixit) and Best Female Playback Singer (Sunidhi Chauhan for "Aaja Nachle").

Plot
Dia (Madhuri Dixit) is a choreographer who lives in New York with her daughter Radha. One day she receives word that her old dance teacher, Makrand, is dying. She returns to her hometown Shamli with Radha, to find that he has already died and left her the responsibility of saving the deserted dance theatre, Ajanta, which is to be demolished to make way for a shopping centre.

Shamli has changed a great deal since Dia left. Her parents left the town in shame a decade ago, after she eloped with an American photographer Steve, (later they divorced) and their house is now owned by the strict Mr. Chojar and his wife. Her childhood friend Najma (Divya Dutta) is married to Farooque (Irrfan Khan), a successful businessman. Both of them greet Dia coldly. The only ally she has left is her old friend Doctor Saab (Raghubir Yadav). To save Ajanta, Dia goes to petition the local MP Raja Uday Singh (Akshaye Khanna). He issues her a challenge; if she can put on a successful performance using only people from Shamli, he will cancel the demolition.

That night Dia dances in Ajanta and afterward calls on the people to help her put up a performance of the famous Laila-Majnu play. Jeering at her, they leave the theatre one by one, but Raja remains behind, reminding her of the challenge. Refusing to accept defeat, Dia goes out into the street the next day to scout for talent. When she returns to the theatre she finds that a group of thugs is burning the set, after being ordered by a local election candidate, Chaudhary Om Singh. Instead of being angry, she is intrigued by the ring-leader, Imran (Kunal Kapoor), and makes a deal with Chaudhary – she will help him win the next election, if he will support Ajanta and if Imran plays Majnu. He agrees and Imran is forced to take on the role. After finding out about the casting of Imran, many girls flock to the theatre for the part of Laila. Among them is Anokhi (Konkona Sen), a tomboy who is in love with Imran. She begs Dia, who is reluctant because of her rough appearance and lack of talent but agrees in the end, thinking that her love for Imran will make her the ideal Laila. Other parts in the play go to Mr. Chojar, who wants to prove to his wife that he is not boring, Chaudhary who plays Laila's father and Dia's former fiancé Mohan, who is able to overcome his bitterness towards her, and takes on the role of Laila's husband.

With one month to put the show together, Dia struggles to get Imran and Anokhi to work together. With Dia's support, Anokhi changes her attitude and appearance to get Imran to take her seriously and soon their relationship deepens. A few days before the show, Farooque pays Chaudhary to abandon Ajanta and makes Najma spread hurtful stories about Dia. Chaudhary tries to get Imran to give up his part, but Imran is aware of Chaudhary's political intentions and refuses, leading him to be attacked by Chaudhary's men while Anokhi tries to protect him, making Imran fall in love with her. With the whole town against her, Dia loses hope until Najma arrives to apologise and asks to be in the show.

On the night of the show, Uday asks the inspector (who later gets roped in to play Laila's father) to make sure that whoever wants to attend the program should not face any obstacles in reaching the venue. Dia is amazed to find that the entire town has come to Ajanta. The troupe put on a performance that amazes and excites the audience, including Chaudhary who is moved to tears. Farooque is stunned to see his wife playing the part of Laila's mother and Mrs. Chojar is shocked and thrilled when her husband appears singing and dancing on stage. In the end, the audience cheers loudly as the cast return to the stage for an encore. The night is a success and Ajanta is saved. Imran and Anokhi become a couple.

Raja Uday tries to convince Dia to stay behind for another round of "fighting" as he has developed a crush on her, but she playfully says no. However, Radha hands over Dia's New York number to Uday, to which Dia does not seem to mind very much and he seems very happy to receive. Afterwards, Dia says her farewells to Shamli, and she and Radha leave to find her parents in another part of India. Imran and Anokhi go on to teach dance classes at Ajanta with Doctor Saab's help and dance becomes an inherent part of Shamli once again. Later it is shown that Raja Uday visits Dia in New York and is seen watching her dance. They smile at each other and he hands her a cup of coffee, implying that they will develop a romance.

Cast

 Madhuri Dixit as Dia Srivastav
 Konkona Sen Sharma as Anokhi Anokhelal as Laila
 Kunal Kapoor as Imran Pathan as Majnu
 Jugal Hansraj as Sanjay Mehra as Laila's brother 
 Akshaye Khanna in a special appearance as MP Raja Uday Singh 
 Divya Dutta as Najma, Dia's best friend as Laila's mother 
 Felix D'Alviella as Steve
 Dalai as Radha, Dia's daughter
 Raghubir Yadav as Doctor Saab
 Vinay Pathak as Mr. Chojar
 Akhilendra Mishra as Chaudhary Om Singh
 Nawazuddin Siddiqui as Dhan Kuber
 Darshan Jariwala as Makarand
 Sushmita Mukherjee as Mrs. Chojar
 Uttara Baokar as Mrs. Srivastav
 Yashpal Sharma as Inspector Sahib as Laila's father 
 Ranvir Shorey as Mohan
 Vinod Nagpal as Dia's Father
 Irrfan Khan as Farooque, Najma's husband (Cameo)
 Divyenndu as MLA's son

Production
Shooting began on 15 January 2007 at Film City in Mumbai and ended in March 2007.

Controversy
The movie was banned in Uttar Pradesh, Haryana, and Punjab on the first three days of its release over alleged casteist remarks. It had a major effect on its box office performance. Dia, the character played by Madhuri Dixit, lip-syncs the lines in the "Aaja Nachle" song rendered by Sunidhi Chauhan, . Dalit groups said the line implied that mochis (the Jatav caste – a caste of cobblers) were inferior to sunars (goldsmiths). Punjab and Haryana followed suit, banning the film the next day.

However, the ban was later lifted in Uttar Pradesh, Punjab and Haryana, after a written apology from the producers and the removal of the controversial lyrics in the title song. The lyrics were replaced by other words: . However, a ban was imposed in the city of Patna on 2 December 2007. The issue was also raised in the Indian Parliament (Lok Sabha) by RPI member Ramdas Athawale who sought a ban by the government for hurting Dalit sentiments, but Information and Broadcasting Minister Priya Ranjan Dasmunsi said that it was the responsibility of state governments to take any such action.

Soundtrack

The film's soundtrack was released on 15 October 2007, composed by Salim–Sulaiman, with lyrics by Jaideep Sahni and Piyush Mishra. A few songs from the final sequence of the movie have not been included on the soundtrack including "Yeh Ishq". The title track of the film which got a lot of popularity was written by Piyush Mishra.

The film's music was well received. This soundtrack debuted at #9 for the first week. The song "O Re Piya" was later used in the 2009 Malaysian movie Talentime.

Reception

Box office 
Aaja Nachle opened to a poor response due to controversy. The domestic performance of the film was below average mostly everywhere. Overseas, the response was lukewarm as well. It managed to collect  and was declared a flop by Box Office India.

Reviews 
The film was received mixed-to-negative reviews from both critics and audiences. The performances of the cast too received mixed reviews. Khalid Mohammed from the Hindustan Times wrote, "Madhuri Dixit has a cool time. Konkona is overacting while Kunal Kapoor is flustered", while Rajeev Masand from CNN-IBN noted, "Madhuri is the one and only star of the film. Konkona Sen Sharma is nothing short of fantastic. Her greatest strength is that she isn't afraid of making a fool of herself and she doesn't worry about being laughed at. As a result, her performance in Aaja Nachle is fearless and uninhibited."

Awards & nominations

53rd Filmfare Awards:
Nominated

 Best Actress – Madhuri Dixit
 Best Female Playback Singer – Sunidhi Chauhan for "Aaja Nachle"
IIFA Awards
 Won – Best Choreography – Vaibhavi Merchant for "Aaja Nachle"
 Nominated – Best Female Playback Singer – Sunidhi Chauhan for "Aaja Nachle"
Stardust Awards
 Nominated – Star of the Year – Female – Madhuri Dixit

References

External links 
 
 

2007 films
2000s Hindi-language films
Yash Raj Films films
2007 directorial debut films
Indian dance films